Caspase recruitment domain-containing protein 14, also known as D-containing MAGUK protein 2 (Carma 2), is a protein in the CARD-CC protein family that in humans is encoded by the CARD14 gene.

Function 

The protein encoded by this gene belongs to the membrane-associated guanylate kinase (MAGUK) family, a class of proteins that functions as molecular scaffolds for the assembly of multiprotein complexes at specialized regions of the plasma membrane. This protein is also a member of the CARD-CC protein family, which is defined by carrying a characteristic caspase-associated recruitment domain (CARD) and a coiled-coil (CC) domain. This protein thus shares a similar domain structure with the CARD10 and CARD11 proteins. The CARD domains of both proteins have been shown to specifically interact with BCL10, a protein known to function as a positive regulator of NF-κB activation. The homotypic interaction with BCL10 is believed to be prevented by the linker region of CARD14, when in an inactive state. CARD14 overexpression leads to an activation of the transcription factor NF-κB and phosphorylation of BCL10. CARD14 has been shown to form a CBM signalosome, similar to the signalling of CARD11, with BCL10 and MALT1.

Link to Psoriasis 

The CARD14 gene was recently identified as the first gene directly linked to the most common form of Psoriasis. It has been suggested that a mutation in the gene plus an environmental trigger were enough to elicit plaque psoriasis. These rare, but highly penetrant, mutations were found to disrupt an auto-inhibited state of CARD14, which leads to the binding of BCL10 and the activation of NF-κB.

References

External links

Further reading